Ballada o Januszku  was a Polish mini series aired from 1988–1989. It was first broadcast on November 8, 1988.
The series was based on the book written by Sławomir Łubiński.

Cast 
 Wiesław Adamowski
 Leonard Andrzejewski
 Mirosław Baka – Stasiek Wątroba
 Stanisław Banasiuk
 Marek Barbasiewicz – wychowawca Lucjan O.
 Wojciech Brzozowicz
 Barbara Brylska – teacher
 Janusz Bylczyński
 Magda Celówna
 Krzysztof Chamiec - adwokat Żurka
 Andrzej Chudy – milicjant Świerczyński
 Anna Ciepielewska - Halina Ściborek, Mariola's mother
 Wiesław Drzewicz - Stefan Ściborek, Mariola's father
 Bożena Dykiel – kierowniczka
 Lidia Fiedosiejewa-Szukszyna - Genowefa Smoliwąs
 Aleksandra Ford-Sampolska
 Marek Frąckowiak
 Aleksander Gawroński
 Marian Glinka - Drodż, nauczyciel WF
 Iwona Głębicka
 Maciej Góraj
 Jarosław Góral – Janusz Smoliwąs
 Andrzej Grąziewicz
 Jolanta Grusznic - Jadzia, koleżanka Gieni
 Wirgiliusz Gryń – Józef Kalisiak
 Zofia Jamry – współlokatorka Gieni w sanatorium
 Małgorzata Kaczmarska
 Maria Klejdysz
 Janusz Kłosiński - adwokat
 Halina Kossobudzka - sędzina
 Roman Kosierkiewicz
 Krzysztof Kotowski
 Ryszard Kotys - hycel
 Andrzej Krasicki
 Piotr Krasicki
 Roman Kruczkowski
 Małgorzata Kurmin - Ela Kwiatek, współpracownica Gieni
 Teresa Lipowska – neighbour Karolakowa
 Gustaw Lutkiewicz – neighbour Karolak
 Jolanta Łagodzińska - Mariola Ściborek, narzeczona Januszka
 Sławomira Łozińska – secretary
 Ignacy Machowski - teacher
 Bohdana Majda - sklepikarka Jeżewska
 Marzena Manteska
 Tadeusz Matejko
 Wiesława Mazurkiewicz – współlokatorka Gieni w sanatorium
 Celina Męcner
 Stanisław Michalski - school director
 Bożena Miefiodow
 Alicja Migulanka - współpracownica Gieni
 Zbigniew Modej
 Jerzy Molga - lekarz w sanatorium
 Jolanta Muszyńska
 Leon Niemczyk - doctor Edmund Żurek
 Janusz Rafał Nowicki - wychowawca w poprawczaku
 Janusz Paluszkiewicz - Karuzela
 Bronisław Pawlik – kuracjusz Sitkowski
 Maciej Perszewski - Arek Żurek
 Józef Pieracki – doctor
 Małgorzata Pritulak
 Sylwester Przedwojewski
 Witold Pyrkosz - dyrektor Tadeusz Stasiak
 Ewa Rudnicka
 Zdzisław Rychter
 Jacek Ryniewicz
 Włodzimierz Saar
 Janina Seredyńska
 Katarzyna Skolimowska
 Bogusław Sochnacki - milicjant Marian Owocny
 Lech Sołuba
 Tadeusz Somogi
 Tatiana Sosna-Sarno - pokojówka w sanatorium
 Ewa Szykulska - Żurkowa
 Michał Szymczyk
 Bożena Szymańska
 Jerzy Turek - mailman
 Paweł Unrug - taksówkarz
 Kazimiera Utrata-Lusztig - krawcowa
 Zdzisław Wardejn - Zdzisiu Mierzwiński, kochanek Gieni
 Hanna Wrycza-Polk - Kwiecińska
 Sylwia Wysocka
 Wojciech Zagórski - photographer

References

Polish television soap operas
1988 Polish television series debuts
1989 Polish television series endings
1980s Polish television series
Telewizja Polska original programming